James Laird Gray (1926–2010) was an important figure in the field of steam turbine technology in the UK.

Born in Glasgow in 1926, he was educated in the early years of WWII and qualified for university entrance at the age of 16. Despite qualifying, Gray was too young to be admitted. He then became an apprentice at Yarrow Shipbuilders Ltd in Scotstown. At 17 he entered Glasgow University, and three years later graduated with a Bachelor of Science (First-Class Honors) in mechanical engineering.

From Scotland, he moved to England to begin working in steam turbine and power station engineering at English Electric in Rugby. In an article published at his retirement, he gave credit for this direction to the chief engineer of English Electric, who said, "forget naval turbines" and steered him towards power station steam turbines which were "the thing of the future."

He married his wife Mary in 1954 and had three children: Alex (b. 1955), Susan (b. 1956), and John (b. 1964).

After English Electric, Gray joined the British Electricity Authority, later known as the Central Electricity Authority (CEA) and then the Central Electricity Generating Board (CEGB), where he became head of the CEGB's Turbine Generator Design Branch. A move by the CEGB's Generation, Design, and Construction Department to Barnwood required him to relocate to Gloucestershire, but he was not happy with the move, and a couple of years later he left to become a Manager of Generation, Design, and Technical Services at the South of Scotland Electricity Board (SSEB) in Glasgow.

At this time, new nuclear power stations were coming into service, providing a large part of Scotland's non-fossil fuel generation capacity. He believed advancing modern nuclear generation capacity to be essential to supplying power in the future, and he regretted the loss of expertise and manufacturing capacity in the sector since the end of new-build nuclear projects in the UK.

During his career, which spanned the entire nationalized electricity supply era in the UK, he received two prestigious awards from the Institute of Mechanical Engineers: the Thomas Hawksley Medal for his investigative work into a major steam turbine failure at Hinkley Point A nuclear power station, and the James Clayton award for work on the ingress of seawater to a reactor at Hunterston B nuclear power station.  He was a Fellow of the Royal Academy of Engineering, a Fellow of the Institution of Mechanical Engineers (IMechE), and a Fellow of the Royal Society of Arts.

Jim Gray retired in the late 1980s and lived with his wife in Garelochhead, the family home since 1975. He stayed busy even while in retirement; he and his wife were key figures in the renovation and management of the Gibson Hall, a community center. He also maintained an active interest in public energy policy, particularly in Scotland. In 2008 he authored the pamphlet Electric Power in the New Scotland, which proposed a renewed commitment to nuclear power generation in Scotland and which formed part of a submission that he made to the Scottish Government Economy, Energy and Tourism Committee's Inquiry into Scotland's Energy Future.

Later in retirement, he lost his sight as a result of glaucoma and subsequently developed chest complaints. After a short period of deteriorating health, he died in the family home on August 2nd, 2010.

Notes

1926 births
2010 deaths
Alumni of the University of Glasgow
Engineers from Glasgow
Scottish mechanical engineers
British nuclear engineers